The VI Velká Cena Masarykova (1935 Masaryk Grand Prix) was a 750 km Grand Prix motor race held on 29 September 1935 at the Masaryk Circuit.

Classification

References

Grand Prix race reports
Czechoslovakian
Grand Prix